Yor the Hunter (original: Henga el cazador) is an Argentine comic series created in 1974 by writer Ray Collins (pseudonym of writer Eugenio Juan Zappietro) and artist Juan Zanotto. It appeared for the first time in the Argentine comics magazine Skorpio.

The saga is set at the beginning of the Neolithic Age, and revolves on the mysterious origins of the main character, a young and blonde hunter, and the mythical Atlantis. The world in which Yor lives is a mix of prehistoric tribes and animals (including dinosaurs and other monsters) and science fiction themes, in particular the last survivors of a very advanced civilization which is now on the verge of extinction. During the series, Hor, the son of Yor and also a young warrior, is introduced.

Translation and adaptation 
The comic appeared in the Italian magazine Lanciostory starting with its first issue (#0) in 1975. The 1983 Italian film Yor, the Hunter from the Future was based on the comic.

References

Sources

 

Argentine comic strips
Comics characters introduced in 1974
1974 comics debuts
Science fiction comics
Fictional prehistoric characters
Prehistoric people in popular culture
Comics set in prehistory
Atlantis in fiction
Argentine comics adapted into films